Al-Mujahidiyah Madrasa  is a madrasah complex in Damascus, Syria. Built in 1141 by Burid governor Mujahid al-Din bin Bazan bin Yammin al-Kurdu.

See also
 Al-Adiliyah Madrasa
 Az-Zahiriyah Library

References

Buildings and structures completed in 1141
12th-century mosques
Mausoleums in Syria
Buildings and structures inside the walled city of Damascus
Madrasas in Damascus
12th-century establishments in the Abbasid Caliphate